Konrad IV the Older (ca. 1384 – 9 August 1447) was a Duke of Oels (Oleśnica), Koźle, half of Bytom and half of Ścinawa during 1412–1416 (with his brothers as co-rulers), since 1416 sole ruler over Kąty, Bierutów, Prudnik and Syców and since 1417 Bishop of Wrocław and Duke of Nysa.

He was the eldest son of Konrad III the Old, Duke of Oleśnica, by his wife Judith. The name of Konrad was also borne by his four younger brothers; they were identified by historians only through letters and regnal numbers.

Life

Church career

Despite the fact that he was the oldest son and had a strong possibility of inherited all his father's duchy, Konrad IV chosen to follow a religious career. He grown rapidly in the Church hierarchy. By the end of 1399, he became the Cleric of Wrocław. One year later he postulated to the office of Canon of Wrocław and Provost of Domasław/Domslau, but he failed; however, this not discouraged Konrad IV, who by 1410 was finally chosen Canon of Wrocław and during 1411-1417 held the office of Provost of the Chapter. In 1411 Konrad IV concentrated all his efforts to his election as Bishop of Warmia. To this end, he went even made the long journey to Rome, and although the expedition was unsuccessfully, as compensation he received with the master's degree and received a papal notary. In 1412 he was appointed Canon of Olomouc.

After the resignation of the Bishop of Wrocław, Duke Wenceslaus II of Legnica in 1417, Pope Martin V appointed him on 17 December 1417 as the new Bishop of Wrocław. Konrad IV was ordained as Bishop on 22 January 1418 at the hands of John Tylemann, suffragent of the Kolegiata of St. Nicholas in Otmuchów.

Beginning of his involvement in politics
Despite his clergy state, Konrad IV also was interested in politics. Already in 1402 he joined to the newly alliance between the Silesian princes. In 1409 he stood with his father at the side of King Wenceslaus IV of Bohemia in the conclusion of a truce between Poland and the Teutonic Knights. In 1412 Konrad IV acted as mediator in the conflicts between the Dukes of Opole, King Wenceslaus IV and the city of Wrocław. Finally, in 1416 together with his brothers, he joined the alliance with the Grand Master of the Teutonic Order, Michael Küchmeister von Sternberg, against the Kingdom of Poland.

In 1412, after the death of his father, Konrad IV became in Duke of Oleśnica together with his younger brother Konrad V Kantner as co-rulers. In 1416, hoping ascend in his church career, Konrad IV renounced in favor of Konrad V and his other younger brothers the government of almost all the duchy, but maintained the control over the towns of from most areas of the duchy of maintaining control over Kąty (Kanth), Bierutów (Bernstadt), Prudnik and Syców.

His years as a ruler over the Diocese of Wrocław and the Duchy of Nysa-Otmuchów coincided with the turbulent period of the Hussite Wars, which largely determined the politics of the Duke-Bishop.

The Hussite Wars
At the beginning of 1420 Konrad IV, together with the other Silesian princes, reunited in the Silesian Sejm in Wrocław and paid tribute to the Emperor Sigismund and then went with his sovereign to Prague, where the Emperor was crowned as King of Bohemia. The Duke-Bishop's fidelity to the House of Luxembourg was strong, even years later when they lost the German Kingdom and retained only the authority over Silesia. Konrad IV was also is involved in organized a crusade against the reign delinquency over the Silesian lands, who ended with the occupation of Broumov.

In 1422 and thanks to his merits the Emperor appointed Konrad IV Governor of Silesia and officially entrusted to him the organization of the fight against the Hussites.

In January 1423 Konrad IV, along with other Silesian princes, was present during the negotiations from an eventual alliance between the Emperor Sigismund and the Teutonic Order against King Władysław II of Poland. Under the terms of the agreement, in the event of the defeated of the Polish Kingdom, was guaranteed to the Silesian princes territorial acquisitions. Finally, the treaty wasn't performed because King Władysław II, after a meeting with the Emperor in Kežmarok, obtained his refusal to participate in the alliance. The Bishop followed the example of his sovereign and, in April 1424 he went with his brother Konrad V to Kalisz, where they reestablished his relations with Poland.

By 1425 he led a new crusade against the Hussites organized by the Kingdom of Bohemia; however, this also was ended in a disaster.

Since 1427 the Hussites engaged in a retaliatory expedition against the lands of Emperor Sigismund's allies; during this trip, they destroyed Lusatia, Złotoryja and Lubań.

In order to neutralize the threat of the Hussites, the Silesian princes and some main cities (like Wrocław and Świdnica) asked the Bishop of Wrocław for mutual aid and offered him the leadership of the coalition. The fear of the cities and princes was demonstrated in the following year, when entered to Silesia a Hussite army under the command of Prokop the Great. Most of the princes concluded further arrangements with the Hussite leader who, in return for a high ransom and free passage through their territories, guarantee them the inviolability of their properties.

Despite the open betrayal by some of the princes, Konrad IV decided to fight, counting with some troops commanded by Duke Jan of Ziębice. The battle was in Stary Wielisław near Nysa on 27 August 1428. The Hussite forces crushed the coalition troops; the Duke of Ziębice was killed in the battle but Konrad IV could escape.

After the battle, Prokop the Great's army spend time in the depths of Silesia and started to burning and destroying most of the Lower and Upper Silesia lands, mainly focusing on the goods of the Bishopric of Wrocław (except on the areas which belonged to the princes and cities that previously treaties with them). In order to obtain some protection, the Duke-Bishop became closer to one of the main Hussites leaders among Silesian princes, Duke Bolko V of Opole.

In subsequent years, despite the defeat of 1428, Konrad IV tried to continue the war against the Hussites in Silesia, counting with the majority of the Wroclaw nobility.

By 1430 since the Northwestern went another expedition Hussites, supported by the Polish mercenary Sigismund Korybut. Konrad IV have to be accept the loss of two important fortress in Niemcza and Otmuchów (who were regained five years later and only after his buying from Hussite commanders).

Finally, in 1432 was seriously damaged the Duke-Bishop's personal patrimony, the Duchy of Oleśnica: Oleśnica was burned, including in the monasteries of Lubiąż and Trzebnica.

In order to secure the possessions of the Church, in 1433 Konrad IV decided to renew "the Union of Silesian princes" (Związek książąt śląskich) on which he stood as his leader again.

Civil war in Silesia
In 1437 the Holy Roman Emperor and King of Bohemia, Sigismund, died. His death brought Bohemia and Silesia in the civil war. The dying Emperor designed his son-in-law Albert V of Habsburg as his heir in all his possessions, but part of Electors decided to choose the younger brother of the King of Poland, Casimir. Konrad IV stood at the side of Albert V and in 1438 took place the decisive battle. The Polish army tried to encourage the Silesian princes to recognize the authority of Casimir as King of Bohemia after a quick attack, but the Duke-Bishop, together with his brother Konrad V persuaded the Polish troops to retreat (which actually happened, but mainly as a result of the unexpected arrival of the powerful Austrian army).

The relative calm in Silesia remained less than two years. In 1440 was made again a double election as King of Bohemia: this time was the posthumous son of Albert V, Władysław, and the King Władysław III of Poland and Hungary. This time the case was much more embroiled, as the two candidates have many supporters (among them, Konrad IV maintain his support to the Habsburg cause and his younger brother Konrad VII the White stood at the side of the Polish King). The subsequent long-term fight debilitated and ruined all the Silesian lands, moreover after a new expedition of the Hussites in 1444.

Financial difficulties and the dispute with the chapter. death
The long wars and interferences of Konrad IV in the politic affairs contributed to deep debts of the Bishopric (who was at the time of his death 8,500 Hungarian guilders), a difficult situation who he leave to his successors.

Financial matters, particularly encouraging Pope Eugene IV to condemn the simony in Basel. This was used by the Chapter and after knew that Konrad IV collected huge sums of money from the Western and Orthodox churches in the Diocese, they decided on 1 August 1444 the formal deposition of the Duke-Bishop. The official reason was the enormous personal debts and a lack of funds for maintenance of his court. However, Pope Eugene IV refused to approve this decision and by the Bull of 21 July 1445 ordered his reposition as Bishop.

To final reconciliation between Konrad IV and the Chapter occurred only in 1446 and under pressure from the military troops of the Duke-Bishop. This enabled him to arrange the diocesan statutes, which reformed the life of the Church of Wrocław.

Konrad IV died on the evening of 9 August 1447 in Jelcz and was buried in the Wrocław Cathedral.

References

This article was translated from his original in Polish Wikipedia.

|-

|-

|-

|-

Canons of Wrocław
1380s births
1447 deaths
Piast dynasty
Prince-Bishops of Breslau
15th-century Roman Catholic bishops in Poland
Burials at Wrocław Cathedral